The Manila Storm is a Philippine rugby league team based in Manila. They play in the Philippines National Rugby League Championship.

History
The club was formed by Papua New Guinean native Timothy Buipe. Their first match was a loss to a Hong Kong residents XIII 40–34 at the Southern Plains Field, Calamba, Laguna. Their second match was a win against the Albay Vulcans 30–14 in what is believed to be the first full 13-a-side domestic rugby league match in the Philippines.

Current squad
1.John Bernard Agunod
2.Ernest Ganat
3.Benny Noki
4.Lauren Chris
5.Romario Capule
6.Timothy Buipe
7.Martin Yami
8.Dan Acero
9.John Franklin Agunod
10.Greg Ranza
11.Al Del Tesoro (captain)
12.James Osias
13.Elvis William Jensen
14.Michael Tome
15.Joe Yanga
16.Joseph Laguihon
17.Stallone Pena
18.Paraka Ranpi
19.McNewton Panga
20.James Presland
21.Solomon Vada
22.Stanley Masalai

References

Philippines National Rugby League teams
Sports teams in Metro Manila
Rugby clubs established in 2015